Alternate uses: Nutgrove, St Helens

Nutgrove is an area in Churchtown, County Dublin.

It is a suburban area at the foot of the Dublin mountains between Churchtown and Rathfarnham around the Nutgrove Shopping Centre.

It used to be the home of HB, an ice cream company in Ireland. HB was originally an abbreviation for Hughes Brothers' Dairy, now produced by Unilever and part of the Heartbrand.  HB Dairies was demolished in 2005 and replaced with several new retail units, apartments and office space. Tenants in the new units include Homebase Hardware, Harvey Normans, an Aldi supermarket and Harry Coreys Furniture.

Nutgrove has a very young population. The area's Loreto Park opposite Nutgrove Shopping Centre often hosts a circus during the summer months. Loreto Park hosts home games of Leicester Celtic and Nutgrove Celtic. Leicester Celtic also have a floodlit, all-weather pitch located off the Barton Road Extension close to Grange Manor and Grange Downs.

Its most famous inhabitant was William Domville Handcock, the eldest son of William Elias Handcock and a descendant of William Handcock (Westmeath politician)|William Handcock, who came to Ireland with Oliver Cromwell's army during the Cromwellian conquest of Ireland and settled at Twyford in County Westmeath. He was born on 2 September 1830, and having been educated at Nutgrove School, Rathfarnham, and at Trinity College, Dublin, took his degree in 1852. As a magistrate for the County Dublin, Mr. Handcock constantly presided on the Tallaght Petty Sessions bench, of which he was a much-valued member. He was also a Guardian of the South Dublin Union, and a frequent attendant at the meetings of that board. For many years he was an active supporter of the Society for the Prevention of Cruelty to Animals. He died on 5 June 1887.

Transport
Nutgrove is served by the following Dublin Bus and Go-Ahead Ireland Routes

Dublin Bus:

14 Dundrum Luas - Ardlea Road

14c Dundrum Luas - Eden Quay

61 Whitechurch- Eden Quay

Go-Ahead Ireland:

75 Dun Laoghaire - Tallaght (The Square)

75a Dun Laoghaire - Tallaght (The Square) via SANDYFORD INDUSTRIAL ESTATE

17 Rialto - Blackrock via UCD

17d Dundrum Luas - Rialto

161 Dundrum Luas - Rockbrook

Schools
The following schools are located in or close to Nutgrove;*
 The Good Shepard Primary School 
 Divine Word National School, Marley Grange.
 Rathfarnham Educate Together National School.
St. Mary’s boys national school

References

Rathfarnham